Liam Daniel Smyth (born 6 September 2001) is a footballer who plays as a forward for Biggleswade Town.

Smyth began his career in the youth academy at [Queens Park Rangers spending 4 seasons before going to[Stevenage F.C.|Stevenage]]. He made his first-team debut in October 2018 and in doing so became the club's youngest debutant in the English Football League. During his time at Stevenage, Smyth was loaned out twice to Braintree Town of the National League South. He was released by Stevenage at the end of the 2020–21 season and subsequently signed for Isthmian League Premier Division club Wingate & Finchley in July 2021.

Club career

Stevenage
Whilst a first year scholar in the Stevenage youth academy, Smyth made his first-team debut in the club's 8–0 defeat to Charlton Athletic in the EFL Trophy on 9 October 2018, coming on as a 57th-minute substitute in the match. In doing so, became the club's youngest debutant in the English Football League, at the age of 17 years and 37 days old, a record that was later broken by Sam Tinubu (17 years and 18 days old). He made his Football League debut in the club's 0–0 home draw with Port Vale on 23 October 2018. Smyth signed his first professional contract with the club on 9 November 2018. He made four appearances for Stevenage during the 2018–19 season, whilst also playing regularly for the club's under-18 team.

Having made two substitute appearances for the first team during the first half of the 2019–20 season, Smyth was loaned out to National League South club Braintree Town on 11 January 2020. He made his Braintree debut on the same day, before scoring his first goal a week later in a 4–1 away victory over Oxford City. The loan agreement was extended for a further month and Smyth scored four times in 10 appearances. Smyth rejoined Braintree on loan in September 2020, scoring once in seven appearances during his time there. He was released by Stevenage at the end of the 2020–21 season.

Wingate & Finchley
Smyth signed a one-year contract with Isthmian League Premier Division club Wingate & Finchley on 27 July 2021. He debuted in the club's 1–0 home defeat to Margate on 14 August 2021, playing the opening 71 minutes of the match.

Biggleswade Town
In March 2022, Smyth signed for Southern League Premier Division Central side Biggleswade Town.

International career
Smyth was called up to represent Northern Ireland at under-19 level for their friendly matches against Slovakia under-19s in September 2018. He had previously trained with the under-19 squad in Lilleshall six months earlier. Smyth played in both matches, scoring the first goal in the second match, an eventual 4–1 victory on 7 September 2018.

Career statistics

References

External links

1999 births
Living people
Association footballers from Northern Ireland
Northern Ireland youth international footballers
Association football forwards
Stevenage F.C. players
Braintree Town F.C. players
Wingate & Finchley F.C. players
Biggleswade Town F.C. players
English Football League players
National League (English football) players
Isthmian League players